The Soling European Championship is an International sailing regatta in the Soling organized by the International Soling Association under auspiciën of World Sailing.
Over 50 Soling European Championship were held. The popularity grew during the Olympic period of the Soling. After that era the event continued and is still reasonable successful.
The Soling European Championship is an "Open" event. This means that competitors from all over the world are eligible to enter.

During the Olympic era of the Soling (1969 - 2000) the European Championships were a primary selection event for the NOC's to determine their Olympic delegation in the class.

Editions

Medalists

Other statistics

Race details
For further detailed results see:
 Soling European Championship results (1968–1979)
 Soling European Championship results (1980–1984)
 Soling European Championship results (1985–1989)
 Soling European Championship results (1990–1994)
 Soling European Championship results (1995–1999)
 Soling European Championship results (2000–2004)
 Soling European Championship results (2005–2009)
 Soling European Championship results (2010–2014)
 Soling European Championship results (2015–2019)
 Soling European Championship results (2020–2024)

References

Soling European Championships
European championships in sailing
Recurring sporting events established in 1968
1968 establishments in Europe